The 2009 Rexall Edmonton Indy was the eleventh round of the 2009 IndyCar Series season, and was held on July 26, 2009 at the  Rexall Speedway in Edmonton, Alberta, Canada.

Qualifying results
 All cars are split into two groups; one of eleven and one of twelve, with the fastest six from each group going through to the "Top 12" session. In this session, the fastest six runners will progress to the "Firestone Fast Six". The fastest driver in this final session will claim pole, with the rest of the runners lining up in session order, regardless of qualifying times. (Fast Six from 1-6, Top 12 from 7-12 and Round 1 from 13-23) Drivers can use as many laps as they want in the timed sessions.

Grid

Race 

 * Race finished under caution.

Standings after the race 

Drivers' Championship standings

References 

2009 in IndyCar
2
Rexall Edmonton Indy
Rexall Edmonton Indy
Rexall Edmonton Indy